The light-mantled albatross (Phoebetria palpebrata) also known as the grey-mantled albatross or the light-mantled sooty albatross, is a small albatross in the genus Phoebetria, which it shares with the sooty albatross. The light-mantled albatross was first described as Phoebetria palpebrata by Johann Reinhold Forster, in 1785, based on a specimen from south of the Cape of Good Hope.

Physiology
Light-mantled albatrosses share some identifying features with other Procellariiformes. They have nasal tubes on the upper bill called naricorns, though with albatrosses these are on the sides of the upper mandible rather than the top. They also have a salt gland above the nasal passage which excretes a concentrated saline solution to maintain osmotic balance, due to the amount of seawater imbibed. The bills of the Procellariiformes are unique in that they are covered with from seven to nine horny plates. These birds produce a stomach oil made up of wax esters and triglycerides that is stored in the proventriculus. This can be sprayed out of their mouths as a defence against predators as well as an energy rich food source for chicks and for the adults during their long flights.

Description
The light-mantled albatross is largely sooty-brown or blackish, darker on the head, with paler upperparts from the nape to the upper tail-coverts which are grey to light grey, the palest on the mantle and back. The plumage has been described as being similar in appearance to the colouring of a Siamese cat. The eyes are partly encircled with thin post-orbital crescents of very short grey feathers.

Distribution and habitat
The light-mantled albatross has a circumpolar pelagic distribution in the Southern Ocean. It ranges in latitude from the pack-ice around Antarctica, with the southernmost record from 78°S in the Ross Sea, to about 35°S, with occasional sightings further north along the Humboldt Current. It breeds on several subantarctic islands including the Prince Edward Island, Marion Island, Crozet Islands, Amsterdam Island, St. Paul Island, Kerguelen Islands, Heard Island, Macquarie Island, Campbell Island, Auckland Islands, Antipodes Islands and South Georgia and at least on one island in the maritime Antarctic at 62°S on King George Island. Except when breeding, its habitat is entirely marine, and it will forage from the edges of the Antarctic pack-ice to about 40°S. When foraging during the breeding season, the birds will remain closer to their nest sites.

Behaviour
They have a loud shrill voice that is trumpet-like, and when threatened will snap their bills or utilize a throaty "gaaaa". When courting, they will utilize aerial displays and formation flying. They will also use mutual calling with deviations in tone brought occurring by head positioning, and finally, they use their tail in displays more than other albatrosses.

Reproduction
The species breeds in loose colonies or small groups, and sometimes is a solitary breeder. The nest is built on a vegetated cliff ledge, or a steep slope, sheltered from the prevailing westerly winds. It incorporates some plant material and a grass lining. Around October or November, a single egg is laid, which is not replaced if lost. Both sexes incubate alternately in shifts that vary from a day or two up to nearly a month in length. The incubation period is 65 to 72 days. After hatching in December or January, which takes 3 to 5 days, the chicks are brooded in shifts for about 20 days, following which they are left alone in the nests while the adults forage, returning to feed the chicks by regurgitation every 2 to 3 days. The entire nestling period from hatching to fledging, which occurs in May or June, lasts 140 to 170 days. Pairs form committed pair-bonds which may last for decades, being renewed through complex courtship displays at the breeding site. On average, birds begin breeding when they are 8 to 15 years old, after which they breed biennially, fledging a chick every five years or so. They are capable of breeding until at least 32 years old and living to 40 or longer.

Feeding
The principal diet of light-mantled albatrosses consists of squid and krill, though other crustaceans and fish are taken as well as seal, penguin and petrel carrion. They sometimes feed in association with pilot whales and southern right whale dolphins, and occasionally follow ships.

Conservation
The light-mantled albatross population is estimated at about 58,000, from a 1998 estimate, and is declining.

Potential predators on some breeding islands are giant petrels, feral cats and rodents. At sea they are threatened by bycatch in the longline fishery and through starvation by eating plastic marine debris.

Footnotes

References

External links 

 Species factsheet - BirdLife International
 Photos - Christopher Taylor Nature Photography

light-mantled albatross
Birds of Patagonia
Birds of islands of the Atlantic Ocean
Birds of the Indian Ocean
Birds of the Southern Ocean
Birds of the Campbell Islands
Fauna of the Crozet Islands
Fauna of the Prince Edward Islands
Fauna of Heard Island and McDonald Islands
light-mantled albatross
Birds of subantarctic islands